Martin Petit (born September 24, 1968 in Laval, Quebec, Canada) is a Canadian comedian and actor. Creator and star of the Sit-com Les Pêcheurs (2012-2017) on Ici Radio-Canada. Known for his one-man shows, Grandeur Nature, Humour libre, Martin Petit et le micro de feu, all of them won best comedy show at Les Olivier comedy award in Montreal.  He is a former member of The Bizarroides. He won a Genie Award for Best Screenplay, for Starbuck. He co-wrote the American Remake of Starbuck with director Ken Scott.

External links 
 Martin Petit website
 

1968 births
Living people
Canadian male film actors
Comedians from Quebec
Best Screenplay Genie and Canadian Screen Award winners
Male actors from Quebec
Writers from Quebec
People from Laval, Quebec